Leckey is a surname. Notable people with the surname include:

Mark Leckey (born 1964), British artist
Nick Leckey (born 1982), American football player
Robert Leckey (born 1975), Canadian law professor

See also
Lackey (surname)
Lecky
Luckey